Coins of Slovakia may refer to:

 Slovak euro coins
 Euro gold and silver commemorative coins (Slovakia)
 Slovak koruna#Coins
 Slovak koruna (1939–1945)#Coins